Luc Barthelet (born 1962) is the CTO of Unity Technologies. Formerly he was CTO and President of Technology at Electronic Arts.  He joined Unity Technologies in December 2018.

Between 2014 and 2018, he circumnavigated on his catamaran with his wife Sarah Flannery and his kids.

He was executive director at Wolfram Alpha (December 2010 – May 2014). Prior to this he was CEO of TirNua, Inc, a games company, which developed an eponymous MMO virtual world. TirNua was acquired by RockYou! in December 2010.

Between 1998 and May 2008 he worked for Electronic Arts. He is famous in the gaming community for engaging with players on blogs and in discussion boards.  In his previous post of Group Studio Head, Electronic Arts, he was also instrumental in the development of persistent state worlds, a responsibility that included Majestic, Motor City Online, Earth and Beyond, Ultima Online and The Sims Online. Before ascending to that position, Barthelet was General Manager of Maxis where he led product development for titles such as The Sims, The Sims 2, SimCity 4 and SimCity 3000.

He has an engineering degree in Mechanics and Electricity from E.S.T.P. in Paris, where he studied while developing his first commercial software (World processor: Epistole, Spreadsheet: Version Calc, Paint program: Paintworks Gold). Luc's software startup VersionSoft was acquired by Electronic Arts in 1988, and he has worked for EA ever since, first leading the development of Paint products (including Studio/8, Studio/1 and Studio./32), then the internal development of games as Chief Technology Officer and then managing the Entertainment Studio in San Mateo.

Barthelet is also an avid Mathematica user, having created the first user community wiki (with forums) at Mathematica-Users.org, which features sculptures designed in Mathematica and realized with 3D printers, glass molds and a 5 Axis CNC Mill he built with Marc Thorpe.

Notes

References 
 LinkedIn Public Profile
 Moby Games Developer BIO
 Special Message EA-Land Closing
 TirNua, an all new Project by Luc Barthelet - New virtual world

External links
 Luc Barthelet Short biography at All Media Guide
 Mathematica Users site created by Barthelet

1962 births
Living people
French businesspeople
Wolfram Research people